Petty Officer  was a Japanese airman in World War II. His A6M Zero was the first of that type (after those recovered after the attack on Pearl Harbor) to be recovered relatively intact on Allied territory when he crash landed on Melville Island, Northern Territory, Australia. Toyoshima was the first Japanese prisoner of war to be captured in Australia. While a prisoner of war, Toyoshima was one of the instigators of the breakout from the prisoner of war camp located in Cowra, New South Wales, Australia, sounding a bugle to signal the commencement of the escape, and died during the escape attempt.

Early life
Toyoshima was born on March 29, 1920. Little is known of Toyoshima's early life.

Raid on Darwin

Toyoshima took part of the 19 February 1942, Japanese air-raid on Darwin, Australia. His Zero, tail code BII-124, was launched from the Japanese aircraft carrier Hiryū. After running out of fuel due to bullet damage to its tanks, his Zero crash-landed on Melville Island, where he was taken prisoner by local islander Matthias Ulungura.

Toyoshima was the first Japanese prisoner of war to be captured in Australian territorial jurisdiction. Toyoshima suffered only superficial facial injuries in the crash-landing. He strove to move as far away from his Zero on foot, understanding that the aircraft would aid Allied Military intelligence. Before Toyoshima's crash, only nine Zeros had been shot down in the Pearl Harbor attack, 74 days before the first air raid on Darwin; their pilots had died, and the badly damaged wrecks were of little use.

After being moved to Darwin, he was transferred to Melbourne by the RAAF for debriefing. A month later he was sent to civilian detention at the Hay detention camp.

Cowra breakout

By the time Toyoshima had arrived at the Cowra POW camp, in December 1942, he had adopted the alias . He actively sought to learn English, both from local internees and friendly guards. allowing him to eventually act as a prisoner leader and translator. One guard also gave him a bugle to practice with.

In August 1944, Toyoshima signaled the 1:45 am start of the mass escape of Japanese prisoners of war from the camp with a bugle call. He died alongside 230 other Japanese in the breakout.

See also
 Akutan Zero

References

External links

The Question of Hajime, 1995 BA Honors thesis produced by Dr Craig Bellamy

Japanese military personnel of World War II
Japanese World War II pilots
Japanese prisoners of war
World War II prisoners of war held by Australia
Japanese military personnel killed in World War II
Date of birth unknown
1920 births
1944 deaths